is a 25-episode Japanese anime television series produced by P.A. Works and directed by Sōichi Masui. It aired from April 5 to September 20, 2017. The anime is described as part of P.A. Works' "working series", which tells the stories about people and their jobs, after Hanasaku Iroha and Shirobako.

Plot
Yoshino Koharu is a young woman looking for a job in Tokyo but is only met with a series of rejections. However, she has a seemingly lucky break when she receives a job offer to work with the tourism board of the economically struggling Manoyama village as their "Queen". With no other choice, Yoshino accepts the offer and travels to Manoyama only to find out that she was hired based on a case of mistaken identity and that her contract term is for one year instead of the one day, as she had initially thought. With nowhere else to go, Yoshino reluctantly becomes Queen of Manoyama.

Characters

The main protagonist. She grew up in a rural area in Japan and went to college in Tokyo in hopes of landing a job in the city, but after failing to land a job she gets an offer to work for the tourism department of Manoyama village, which runs a micronation called the Chupacabra Kingdom. She had actually visited Manoyama as a child and was treated as a queen during her visit. At the end of the series, she leaves Manoyama as the tourism board has decided to disband the Chupacabra Kingdom.

A native of Manoyama and member of the tourism board, Shiori is a friendly and kind hearted girl who wants to see the town improve and acts as Yoshino's guide.

 An amateur actor and local celebrity in Manoyama, Maki is famed for a bit part she played in a television series called the Oden Detective. 

 Ririko is the granddaughter of the local sweets shop owner and is a fan of the occult.

 A web entrepreneur, Sanae is a Tokyo native who moved to Manoyama to escape city life. 

 The grouchy head of Manoyama's tourism board and the King of the town. He acts as Yoshino's direct superior. He was in a band with Chitose during his youth and planned to leave Manoyama, but stayed after an incident during the town's festival.

 Ririko's grandmother who runs a sweets shop. She was in a band with Ushimatsu during her youth.

Manoyama's sole bus driver. 

Kinoshita is a member of a rockband with Tokichiro and Hideyoshi. Later he performs a live concert at Manoyama's founding festival per Yukiya Amamiya's request.

Broadcast and distribution
Sakura Quest is directed by Sōichi Masui and produced by P.A. Works. It ran for 25 episodes and it aired in Japan from April 5 to September 20, 2017, on Tokyo MX, with further broadcasts on ABC, AT-X, BS11, and Tulip TV. Alexandre S. D. Celibidache is credited with the original work, and the screenplay was written by Masahiro Yokotani. Kanami Sekiguchi based the character design used in the anime on Bunbun's original designs. The music is produced by the band (K)NoW_NAME, who also perform the opening and ending themes. The first opening theme is "Morning Glory" and the first ending theme is "Freesia". The second opening theme is "Lupinus" and the second ending theme is "Baby's Breath". The anime is licensed by Funimation in North America with an English dub, and the series was streamed by Crunchyroll with English subtitles.

Notes

References

External links
Official website 

2017 anime television series debuts
Anime with original screenplays
Funimation
P.A.Works
Toho Animation
Tokyo MX original programming
Slice of life anime and manga